Barham Friary was a Crutched Friars friary in Linton, Cambridgeshire, England. It was established around 1272 and was dissolved in 1538.

References

Monasteries in Cambridgeshire
1272 establishments in England
1539 disestablishments in England
Christian monasteries established in the 13th century
Linton, Cambridgeshire